is a baseball manga series by Akio Chiba which ran in Monthly Shōnen Jump (published by Shueisha) from 1972 to 1979. This series ran concurrently with another Chiba manga series Play Ball, which ran in Weekly Shōnen Jump (also published by Shueisha) from 1973 to 1978. Captain, along with Play Ball, won the 22nd Shogakukan Manga Award for shōnen in 1977. The manga sequel was drawn by Yuji Moritaka himself in February 2017.

The manga was adapted into a film by Eiken and released in theaters on 1981-07-18. It was also adapted into a 26 episode anime television series which aired on NTV from 1983-01-10 to 1983-07-04. The TV series was also directed by Satoshi Dezaki. The Captain TV series was ranked 95th in the top 100 favorite anime titles of all time in a web poll conducted by TV Asahi in 2005. In a 2006 TV Asahi survey of Japanese celebrities, the Captain TV series ranked 13th in a list of the top 100 responses.

The story features 4 captains.  When the captain graduate from school, the next captain becomes the protagonist.

Film

Staff
Original Creator: Akio Chiba
Planning: Takeshi Yoshikawa (NTV)
Producers: Tōru Horikoshi (NTV), Masayasu Sagisu (Eiken)
Director: Satoshi Dezaki
Production Assistant: Hiroyuki Kamii
Animation Directors: Shigetaka Shimizu, Keizō Shimizu
Screenplay: Noboru Shiroyama
Photographer: Shin Iizuka
Music: Toshiyuki Kimori
Art Director: Moritoshi Endō
Audio Director: Hiroshi Sakonjō
Editors: Toshiaki Yabuki, Masahiko Kawana

Sources:

TV series

Staff
Original Creator: Akio Chiba
Planning: Takeshi Yoshikawa (NTV)
Producers: Tōru Horikoshi (NTV), Masayasu Sagisu (Eiken)
Director: Satoshi Dezaki
Scripts: Noboru Shiroyama, Keisuke Fujikawa
Animation Directors: Shigetaka Shimizu, Keizō Shimizu
Music: Toshiyuki Kimori

Theme songs
Both songs were composed and arranged by Toshiyuki Kimori, with lyrics by Michio Yamagami. Vocals were by 99Harmony.
Opening: Kimi wa Nanika ga Dekiru
Ending: Arigatō

References

External links
 Bandai Channel Showtime (TV series)
 Bandai Channel Showtime (movie)
 

1972 manga
1980 anime films
1981 anime films
1983 anime television series debuts
1983 Japanese television series endings
Anime series based on manga
Anime television films
Baseball in anime and manga
Eiken (studio)
Animated films based on manga
Manga adapted into films
Nippon TV original programming
School life in anime and manga
Shueisha franchises
Shueisha manga
Shōnen manga
Winners of the Shogakukan Manga Award for shōnen manga